Alex Barlow (10 April 1880 – 21 April 1937) was an Australian rules footballer who played for the Carlton Football Club in the Victorian Football League (VFL).

Barlow was born Alexander George Merritt, the son of Harriet Annie Merritt, and took the surname Barlow when she married George Booker Barlow in 1883.

Notes

External links 

	
Alex Barlow's profile at Blueseum

Australian rules footballers from Melbourne
Carlton Football Club players
1880 births
1937 deaths
People from Carlton, Victoria